Noorda anthophilalis is a moth in the family Crambidae. It was described by Strand in 1909. It is found in Tanzania.

References

Moths described in 1909
Crambidae